The Melbourne Mustangs are an ice hockey team based in Melbourne, Victoria, Australia and are members of the Australian Ice Hockey League (AIHL). Founded in 2010, as the Mustangs Ice Hockey Club, the team joined the AIHL in 2011 and have made the Goodall Cup playoffs on two occasions, winning once in 2014. Since their inception, 79 players have played at least one regular season game for the Mustangs. The team's current captain is Michael McMahon who has held that position since the 2017 season, taking over from Patrick O'Kane. Australian Jamie Bourke leads the team in scoring with 231 points in 145 games.

Legend

Statistics complete as of the end of the 2017 AIHL season.

Goaltenders

Skaters

References
General

Specific

 
Australia sport-related lists
Ice hockey-related lists
Melbourne sport-related lists